The 2017 WTA Tour was the elite professional tennis circuit organised by the Women's Tennis Association (WTA) for the 2017 tennis season. The 2017 WTA Tour calendar comprises the Grand Slam tournaments (supervised by the International Tennis Federation (ITF), the WTA Premier tournaments (Premier Mandatory, Premier 5, and regular Premier), the WTA International tournaments, the Fed Cup (organized by the ITF), the year-end championships (the WTA Tour Championships and the WTA Elite Trophy). Also included in the 2017 calendar is the Hopman Cup, which is organized by the ITF and does not distribute ranking points.

Schedule
This is the complete schedule of events on the 2017 calendar, with player progression documented from the quarterfinals stage.
Key

January

February

March

April

May

June

July

August

September

October

November

Statistical information
These tables present the number of singles (S), doubles (D), and mixed doubles (X) titles won by each player and each nation during the season, within all the tournament categories of the 2017 WTA Tour: the Grand Slam tournaments, the year-end championships (the WTA Tour Championships and the Tournament of Champions), the WTA Premier tournaments (Premier Mandatory, Premier 5, and regular Premier), and the WTA International tournaments. The players/nations are sorted by: 1) total number of titles (a doubles title won by two players representing the same nation counts as only one win for the nation); 2) cumulated importance of those titles (one Grand Slam win equalling two Premier Mandatory/Premier 5 wins, one year-end championships win equalling one-and-a-half Premier Mandatory/Premier 5 win, one Premier Mandatory/Premier 5 win equalling two Premier wins, one Premier win equalling two International wins); 3) a singles > doubles > mixed doubles hierarchy; 4) alphabetical order (by family names for players).

Key

Titles won by player

Titles won by nation

Titles information
The following players won their first main circuit title in singles, doubles, or mixed doubles:
Singles
 Lauren Davis – Auckland (draw)
 Kateřina Siniaková – Shenzhen (draw)
 Elise Mertens – Hobart (draw)
 Kristina Mladenovic – St. Petersburg (draw)
 Ashleigh Barty – Kuala Lumpur (draw)
 Daria Kasatkina – Charleston (draw)
 Markéta Vondroušová – Biel (draw)
 Jeļena Ostapenko – French Open (draw)
 Anett Kontaveit – 's-Hertogenbosch (draw)
 Daria Gavrilova – New Haven (draw)
 Zarina Diyas – Tokyo International (draw)
 Alison Van Uytvanck – Quebec City (draw)
 Carina Witthöft – Luxembourg City (draw)

Doubles
 Jeļena Ostapenko – St. Petersburg (draw)
 Nao Hibino – Monterrey (draw)
 Nadia Podoroska – Bogotá (draw)
 Dalila Jakupović – İstanbul (draw)
 Nicole Melichar – Nürnberg (draw)
 Anna Smith – Nürnberg (draw)
 Dominika Cibulková – 's-Hertogenbosch (draw)
 Monique Adamczak – Nottingham (draw)
 Storm Sanders – Nottingham (draw)
 Quirine Lemoine – Båstad (draw)
 Arantxa Rus – Båstad (draw)
 Jiang Xinyu – Nanchang (draw)
 Tang Qianhui – Nanchang (draw)
 Lesley Kerkhove – Luxembourg City (draw)
 Lidziya Marozava – Luxembourg City (draw)
 Duan Yingying – WTA Elite Trophy (draw)

Mixed doubles
 Abigail Spears – Australian Open (draw)
 Gabriela Dabrowski – French Open (draw)

The following players defended a main circuit title in singles, doubles, or mixed doubles:
Singles
 Simona Halep – Madrid (draw)
 Kiki Bertens – Nürnberg (draw)
 Caroline Wozniacki – Tokyo (draw)

Doubles
 Sania Mirza – Brisbane (draw)
 Chan Hao-ching – Taipei (draw), Hong Kong (draw)
 Chan Yung-jan – Taipei (draw), Hong Kong (draw)
 Martina Hingis – Rome (draw)
 Abigail Spears – Stanford (draw)
 Ekaterina Makarova – Toronto (draw)
 Elena Vesnina – Toronto (draw)
 Shuko Aoyama – Tokyo International (draw)
 Andrea Hlaváčková – Quebec City (draw), Moscow (draw)
 Johanna Larsson – Seoul (draw), Linz (draw)
 Kiki Bertens – Linz (draw)

Top 10 entry
The following players entered the top 10 for the first time in their careers:
Singles
 Elina Svitolina (enters at No. 10 on February 27)
 Jeļena Ostapenko (enters at No. 10 on September 11)
 Caroline Garcia (enters at No. 9 on October 9)
 Kristina Mladenovic (enters at No. 10 on October 23)
 CoCo Vandeweghe (enters at No. 10 on November 6)

Doubles
 Barbora Strýcová (enters at No. 10 on March 20)

WTA rankings
These are the WTA rankings of the top 20 singles players, doubles players, and the top 10 doubles teams on the WTA Tour, at the end of the 2017 season.

Singles

Number 1 ranking

Doubles

Number 1 ranking

Prize money leaders
For the first time since the 2001 season, at the age of 37, Venus Williams topped the money list with $5,468,741. The top-37 players earned over $1,000,000.  Martina Hingis and Yung-Jan Chan each made over $1.4 million by playing exclusively in doubles tournaments.  It was the 4th consecutive year that a player earned over $1,000,000 in doubles events.

Statistics leaders

Points distribution

S = singles players, D = doubles teams, Q = qualification players.
* Assumes undefeated Round Robin match record.

WTA fan polls

Player of the month

Breakthrough of the month

Shot of the month

Retirements 
Following is a list of notable players (winners of a main tour title, and/or part of the WTA rankings top 100 (singles) or (doubles) for at least one week) who announced their retirement from professional tennis, became inactive (after not playing for more than 52 weeks), or were permanently banned from playing, during the 2017 season:

 Alberta Brianti – The former world number 55 announced her retirement in 2017.
 Ekaterina Bychkova – The former world number 66 announced her retirement in 2017.
 Kimiko Date – The former world number 4 announced she will retire for a second time after the 2017 Japan Open.
 Vesna Dolonc – The former world number 84 announced her retirement from professional tennis in February 2017.
 Vera Dushevina – The former singles world number 34 and doubles world number 27 announced her retirement from professional tennis on 15 August 2017.
 Daniela Hantuchová – The former world number 5 and four-time mixed doubles grand slam champion announced her retirement from professional tennis in July 2017.
 Martina Hingis – The former world number 1 in both singles and doubles, having turned professional in 1994. First retired in 2002 due to injuries, she had a comeback in 2006 after three years of inactivity and retired for the second time in 2008 after being banned for drug usage. She then announced a comeback in 2013, before retiring for a third and final time after the 2017 WTA Finals.
 Liezel Huber – The former doubles world number 1 and seven-time doubles grand slam champion announced her retirement from professional tennis in April 2017.
 Melanie Oudin – The former world number 31 and US Open mixed champion announced her retirement from professional tennis in August 2017.
 Shahar Pe'er – The former world number 11 announced her retirement from professional tennis in February 2017.
 Nadia Petrova – The former world number 3 announced her retirement from professional tennis in January 2017.
 Jocelyn Rae – The former doubles world number 67 announced her retirement from professional tennis in December 2017.
 Jarmila Wolfe – The former world number 25 and Australian Open mixed champion announced her retirement from professional tennis in January 2017.

Comebacks
  Vera Zvonareva

See also

2017 ATP World Tour
2017 WTA 125K series
2017 ITF Women's Circuit
Women's Tennis Association
International Tennis Federation

References

External links
Women's Tennis Association (WTA) official website
International Tennis Federation (ITF) official website

 
WTA Tour seasons
WTA Tour